The Andorran Rugby Federation is the governing body for rugby union in Andorra. It was founded in 1986 and became affiliated to the International Rugby Board in 1991.

Teams

Men
 Andorra - the national men's rugby union team.
 7s - the national men's rugby union seven-a-side team.

Women
 Women's 7s - the national women's rugby union seven-a-side team.

See also
 Andorra national rugby union team
 Rugby union in Andorra

References

External links
  Federació Andorrana de Rugby - Official Site
  - Fan Site for Andorran Rugby

Rugby
Rugby union in Andorra
Rugby union governing bodies in Europe
World Rugby members
Sports organizations established in 1986
Rugby